Perpugilliam “Peri” Brown, is a fictional character played by Nicola Bryant in the long-running British science fiction television series Doctor Who.

An American botany major from Fell's Point in Baltimore, Maryland, Peri is a companion of the Fifth (Peter Davison) and Sixth Doctor (Colin Baker) and a regular in the programme from 1984 to 1986, appearing in a total of 11 stories (collectively made up of 33 episodes).

Production

Getting the part 
Bryant had been spotted by an agent in a production of the musical comedy No, No Nanette at her drama school, the Webber Douglas Academy of Dramatic Art, which was the last show she did before leaving the school. She had performed with an American accent during the show, and having mistaken her for a real American, the agent took note of "one American...". In less than a week after leaving the school, he phoned her up and secured her an audition for Doctor Who.

Bryant thought it was "extraordinary" and "surreal" to be called up out of the blue for a part. The actress did a series of auditions with the producer John Nathan-Turner and the script editor Eric Saward. Initially thinking she had "nothing to lose", she enjoyed the experience and only expected to be offered a small part at most, but became nervous as she got closer to securing the role of Peri.

The accent 
Nathan-Turner was only auditioning Americans, and the British actress had to feign an American accent during the process. The agent had promised to tell the production that Bryant was British if she was successful, however this was ultimately unfulfilled.

As part of her contract, Bryant was required to use her American accent at all public events, barring the local pop to the supermarket; this included BBC canteens and rehearsal rooms. The young actress simply "got on with it" throughout her entire run on the show and later described it as the "longest role [she] ever played".

Bryant revealed her British accent to Colin Baker at a dinner party; after his departure, Baker revealed her non-American origins to the newspapers, which he described as "doing [her] a favour". Decades later, Bryant finds that her American accent can still subconsciously slip into conversation, and noted that fans are often still surprised to discover that she is not American.

Makeup and costume 
Bryant derided the costume that she wore on Doctor Who. She remembered consistently having her buttocks tapped while walking through the BBC lot, and that she would have to laugh and say "thank you" in response then walk a little faster or duck into the bathroom. She recalled a four to five-hour makeup process for Mindwarp (1986) being artificially sped up by the makeup department, leading to the prosthetic being ripped from her face; while shooting in the sun the following days, her face was unbearably sore. The skimpy outfit she wore in her first story Planet of Fire (1984), while appropriate for the Mediterranean weather of its setting, was inappropriate for British winter and caused her to get frostbite and pneumonia.

The character 
As her first job after leaving drama school, Bryant expected to receive a character sheet to give her a window into Peri's backstory. After not receiving one, she opted to write one herself, expecting Nathan-Turner to have it incorporated into the scripts, which he did not do. She initially felt that a companion must either be an adrenaline junkie or someone running from their past, because otherwise once someone realises how dangerous the Doctor's travels are, all they would want to do is go back, and also noted that in real life a person finding themselves in the companion's situation would have a nervous breakdown early on. Taking this into consideration, Bryant decided that it was Peri's choice to join the Doctor, that she was so miserable in the life she had on Earth that she wanted to do it, and that she would take on some of the Doctor's strength and courage throughout their adventures.

Similarly to previous companions, Peri's role was often perfunctory in nature, running off and getting in trouble so that the Doctor could save her. For this purposes of enjoying the adventures, the actress was required to "sugarcoat the trauma" of the character nearly dying each episode. To avoid any suggestion of a romantic relationship, Bryant played to the Fifth Doctor as a father figure; she had devised that he was reminiscent of Peri's deceased father, a touch that was never shown on-screen but that Nathan-Turner approved of. Bryant did not like the way that Peri was written in Timelash (1985) as she felt that she bore no resemblance to the character she had started out with, and felt it was unnecessary that during her time on the show she spent "three out of four episodes" tied-up. Bryant said the story "harked back to the 60s, where basically the companion gets tied up and left somewhere to scream a lot."

Time on the show 
Bryant started filming in September 1983. The director of Planet of Fire, Fiona Cumming, encouraged her to observe and learn from Peter Davison. Bryant had the possibility of a three-year contract and expected to be working with Davison during this time, so was shocked that she would be working alongside a new lead actor after just two stories, and particularly shocked at only learning this over the news. Bryant noted that this abrupt change meant she was not able to "settle in".

Bryant found out about the show being put on hiatus in 1985 through a phone call after returning home from Venice. A Daily Mirror journalist asked for her thoughts on the "death of Doctor Who", leaving her thinking that Baker had died.

Leaving the show 
When Bryant's contract was coming to an end, Nathan-Turner asked her how she would like Peri to be written out of the show. She advised that she did not want to shake hands and say a generic line such as "bye Doctor, I'll send you a postcard", and that she wanted a dramatic storyline to "go out with a bang". She was pleased with Philip Martin's "powerful" Mindwarp storyline involving a mind transplant and a bald head sequence. She was displeased, however, with the retcon at the end of the season which suggested that Peri had married King Yrcanos (Brian Blessed), as she and Blessed had not played any romantic interaction between the two characters. She feels that the explanation of what happened to Peri, in the Big Finish audio story Peri and the Piscon Paradox (2011), fixed this plot hole and should be considered canon.

Critical reception 
Digital Spy felt that her demise was "the most dramatic and heart-stopping exit by a Doctor Who companion ever".

Legacy 
Bryant's first convention was in November 1983, just a few months after she started shooting, despite having no footage to show. She later described the experience as a hysteria on par with Beatlemania. She required a bodyguard and stayed in a huge hotel suite. A man fainted after noticing her. At a later convention, she recalled a disabled man giving her a stuffed dog as a gift and describing Peri as his best friend. Bryant would later quasi-reprise her role as Peri in the form of 'Miss Brown' in the BBV video series The Stranger, which co-starred Baker as the titular Doctor-inspired role. She has also acknowledged that the bluntness of Peri's death upset many fans of the show.

During a convention in 2017, Bryant discussed the positive impact that her time on Doctor Who has had on her life: She has been able to travel the world and make close friendships because of the show, and expressed that she never expected it to become such a huge part of her life. She stated that there is not one of her stories that she would not wish to reshoot, noting her respect for The Caves of Androzani (1984) as a whole piece and believed the themes in Vengeance on Varos (1985) were still relevant. She also explained that the backstory of later companion Rose Tyler, the first companion of the revived series which began in 2005, was very reminiscent of the backstory she had constructed for Peri.

Character history

Peri first appeared in the Fifth Doctor serial Planet of Fire, in which she encountered the Doctor and Turlough on the island of Lanzarote. After an encounter with the Master and the shape-changing android Kamelion (who disguises himself as her stepfather, Professor Howard Foster), Peri asked to join the Fifth Doctor on his travels, while Turlough departed to return to his home planet of Trion. (The identity of Peri's mother was not revealed in the televised series - but see below.)

By the end of the Fifth Doctor's final story The Caves of Androzani, both The Doctor and Peri were suffering from spectrox poisoning, and so the Fifth Doctor decided to give what antidote remains to Peri, sacrificing himself to save her. As she looks on, he regenerates into the Sixth Doctor, and she continued to travel with him, despite the temporarily unstable Doctor attempting to strangle her after his transformation (in his debut story The Twin Dilemma).

Peri is a bright and spirited young woman, an undergraduate and thus likely around twenty years of age, who travelled with The Doctor because, like many of his companions, she wanted to see the universe. Although she shared a more abrasive relationship with the Sixth Doctor, there was an undercurrent of affection in their verbal sparring.

Peri travelled with The Doctor for an undisclosed period of time; some sources say she travelled with him for mere months, while others say years. Between the events of Revelation of the Daleks and the season-long story The Trial of a Time Lord, her character was shown to have matured somewhat (coinciding with an 18-month production break between the two stories) and her relationship with The Doctor became less combative.

In the second segment of the Trial story arc, Mindwarp, Peri was abducted by an arthropod-like creature named Kiv, who apparently transplanted his brain into her body. Soon after, The Doctor was led to believe that Peri was dead, and was severely distressed by this. It was later revealed, at the end of The Ultimate Foe (the fourth segment of the arc), that the evidence of Peri's death was faked by the Valeyard. In fact, Peri had survived, and been saved by - whilst also marrying - King Yrcanos of Thoros Alpha, a warrior king who had assisted the Doctor and Peri in Mindwarp. It is not known what happened to Peri after she married King Yrcanos.

Other appearances
Peri has the distinction of being the first humanoid television companion to appear in the comic strip within Doctor Who Magazine; previously the strip, which began in 1979, depicted The Doctor either travelling alone or with companions created for the strip, while the robotic television companion K9 was featured in several DWM comic strips featuring the Fourth Doctor). Her first appearance was in "Funhouse Part 1" (DWM #102) in which she appeared in two panels as a scantily clad apparition manifested by a villain. Two issues later, in "Kane's Story Part 1" (DWM #104), she became a regular character in the strip, initially travelling with both the Sixth Doctor and his shape-shifting companion, Frobisher and continuing until the final part of "Up Above the Gods" in DWM #129. "Kane's Story" established that, at one point during her travels with the Sixth Doctor, Peri left the TARDIS for reasons left unrevealed and went to live in New York City where she took a job in an office, a job she angrily quit for reasons also unrevealed just prior to encountering The Doctor again and voluntarily rejoining him.

The epilogue to the Target Books novelisation of Mindwarp, written by Philip Martin, stated that Peri returned to the 20th Century with King Yrcanos where the latter became a professional wrestler. This tongue-in-cheek conclusion was not reflected in any televised story, and is generally ignored by fandom.

In the Marvel Comics graphic novel The Age of Chaos, written by Colin Baker, Peri lived out her life on Krontep as Queen Consort of Yrcanos and has at least three grandchildren, who are principal characters in the story.

The Virgin New Adventures novel Bad Therapy by Matthew Jones reveals that, although becoming the wife of King Yrcanos, Peri blamed The Doctor for abandoning her. In the novel, the Seventh Doctor made peace with Peri after she found her way back to Earth through a temporal rift on Krontep, and returned her to her time.

The Telos novella Shell Shock by Simon A. Forward reveals that Peri had been sexually abused by her stepfather. This is hinted at in the Past Doctor Adventures novel Synthespians™ by Craig Hinton, which also reveals that her parents were Janine and Paul Brown, and that her father died in a boating accident when she was thirteen. She has two step-siblings from her mother's marriage to Foster.

Bryant voiced the character of Peri in several audio plays produced by Big Finish Productions, alongside both Peter Davison as the Fifth Doctor and Colin Baker as the Sixth Doctor. In several of these stories, the Fifth Doctor and Peri are joined by another companion, the Egyptian princess Erimem. The Sixth Doctor audio play The Reaping introduces Peri's mother, Janine Foster, played by American actress Claudia Christian (although in reality, Christian is five years younger than Nicola Bryant). The play, set in 1984 as the Doctor takes Peri back to her time to attend the funeral of the father of a friend of hers, confirms Peri's late father's name as Paul and mentions that Howard and Janine Foster have gone their separate ways, but does not mention Peri's step-siblings. After The Doctor and Peri thwart a Cyberman attempt to set up a conversion factory in Baltimore, Peri plans to stay with her family, but Janine is subsequently killed due to an accident involving remaining Cyber-technology, cutting Peri's last familial tie to Earth and prompting her to return to her travels with The Doctor when he comes to visit her at her mother's grave.

In the audio play Her Final Flight, the Sixth Doctor finds Peri on a remote planet, where she apparently dies of a virus, although it is revealed that the entire story was part of a fantasy designed to make The Doctor kill himself.

Another audio play, Peri and the Piscon Paradox, states that the Time Lords made several adjustments to her time line, resulting in at least five alternate versions of Peri with different fates, including one that thought she never travelled in the TARDIS but instead moved to California and eventually hosted a chat show called The Queen of Worries after divorcing her abusive childhood sweetheart.

In the later audio The Widow's Assassin, The Doctor travels to Krontep to attend Peri's wedding, only be locked up for abandoning her. However, despite apparently spending five years in prison, The Doctor actually spends that time carrying out a complex long-term investigation into the death of King Yrcanos shortly after the wedding, eventually learning that 'Peri' is actually possessed by The Doctor's childhood imaginary enemy, Mandrake the Lizard King, who was 'extracted' from The Doctor's mind when he was exposed to Crozier's equipment. After transferring himself into Peri's body to expel Mandrake, The Doctor and Peri return to their true bodies and resume their travels together. In Masters of Earth, they arrive on Earth during the Dalek occupation, a year before the events of The Dalek Invasion of Earth from Earth's perspective, forcing The Doctor to help a future famous rebel figure escape without compromising history. In The Rani Elite, The Doctor and Peri visit a famous university and are nearly caught in a trap set by a version of the Rani who has already experienced the events of Time and the Rani; the crisis ends with Peri receiving an honorary degree in botany to accompany The Doctor's honorary degree in moral philosophy.

Future show runner Steven Moffat mentions an unnamed 'Warrior Queen on Thoros Beta' in his 1996 short story, "Continuity Errors".

Bryant played the role of 'Miss Brown' in the first three instalments of the BBV video series The Stranger, opposite Colin Baker in the title role; although her character was never explicitly identified as being Peri (much as The Stranger was never directly linked to The Doctor), there are nonetheless similarities in the two characters, with one major difference: Bryant used her natural English accent for Miss Brown, rather than affecting an American accent as she did with Peri.

List of appearances

Television
Season 21

Planet of Fire
The Caves of Androzani
The Twin Dilemma

Season 22

Attack of the Cybermen
Vengeance on Varos
The Mark of the Rani
The Two Doctors
Timelash
Revelation of the Daleks

Season 23 - The Trial of a Time Lord

The Mysterious Planet
Mindwarp
The Ultimate Foe (cameo)

30th Anniversary Charity Special
Dimensions in Time

Audio dramas
BBC Radio
Slipback

Doctor Who: The Monthly Adventures

Fifth Doctor
Red Dawn
The Eye of the Scorpion
The Church and the Crown
Nekromanteia
The Axis of Insanity
The Roof of the World
Three's a Crowd
The Council of Nicaea
The Kingmaker
Exotron & Urban Myths
Son of the Dragon
The Mind's Eye & Mission of the Viyrans
The Bride of Peladon

Sixth Doctor
Whispers of Terror
...ish
The Reaping
Year of the Pig
Recorded Time and Other Stories
1963: The Space Race
Breaking Bubbles and Other Stories
The Widow's Assassin
Masters of Earth
The Rani Elite
Memories of a Tyrant
Emissary of the Daleks
Harry Houdini's War
Blood on Santa's Claw and Other Stories
Plight of the Pimpernel

Doctor Who: The Sixth Doctor Adventures

Her Final Flight
Cryptobiosis
The Sixth Doctor and Peri: Volume One
The Headless Ones
Like
The Vanity Trap
Conflict Theory

Doctor Who: The Lost Stories

The Nightmare Fair
Mission to Magnus
Leviathan
The Hollows of Time
Paradise 5
Point of Entry
The Song of Megaptera
The Macros
The Guardians of Prophecy
Power Play
The First Sontarans
The Ultimate Evil

Doctor Who: Special Releases

The Veiled Leopard
Destiny of the Doctor: Trouble in Paradise
The Light at the End

Doctor Who: The Companion Chronicles
Peri and the Piscon Paradox

Doctor Who: Short Trips

Fifth Doctor
Wet Walls
A Room with No View
Rulebook
The Meaning of Red

Sixth Doctor
Seven to One
Murmurs of Earth
To Cut a Blade of Grass
The Shadows of Serenity
Prime Winner
The Authentic Experience
Under ODIN's Eye
Not Forgotten

Novels
Make Your Own Adventure
 Crisis in Space by Michael Holt
Virgin Missing Adventures
State of Change by Christopher Bulis
Burning Heart by Dave Stone
Virgin New Adventures
Bad Therapy by Matthew Jones
Past Doctor Adventures
Players by Terrance Dicks
Grave Matter by Justin Richards
Superior Beings by Nick Walters
Palace of the Red Sun by Christopher Bulis
Warmonger by Terrance Dicks
Blue Box by Kate Orman
Synthespians™ by Craig Hinton
Telos Doctor Who novellas
Shell Shock by Simon A. Forward
Blood and Hope by Iain McLaughlin

Short stories
"Fascination" by David J. Howe (Decalog)
"Timeshare" by Vanessa Bishop (Decalog 2: Lost Property)
"Moon Graffiti" by Dave Stone (More Short Trips)
"Hot Ice" by Christopher Bulis (More Short Trips)
"A Town Called Eternity" by Lance Parkin and Mark Clapham (Short Trips and Sidesteps)
"Turnabout is Fair Play" by Graeme Burk (Short Trips and Sidesteps)
"Reunion" by David Carroll (Doctor Who Magazine #191)
"Vigil" by Michael Collier (Out of the Darkness)
"Five Card Draw" by Todd Green (Short Trips: Zodiac)
"The Stabber" by Alison Lawson (Short Trips: Zodiac)
"The Canvey Angels" by David Bailey (Short Trips: Companions)
"Light at the End of the Tunnel" by Mark Wright (Short Trips: Steel Skies)
"The Ruins of Heaven" by Marc Platt (Short Trips: Steel Skies)
"CHAOS" by Eric Saward (Short Trips: Past Tense)
"Graham Dilley Saves The World" by Iain McLaughlin and Claire Bartlett (Short Trips: Past Tense)
"A Star is Reborn" by Richard Salter (Short Trips: Life Science)
"The Reproductive Cycle" by Matthew Griffiths (Short Trips: Life Science)
"The Gangster's Story" by Jon de Burgh Miller (Short Trips: Repercussions)
"Categorical Imperative" by Simon Guerrier (Short Trips: Monsters)
"Trapped!" by Joseph Lidster (Short Trips: Monsters)
"Telling Tales" by David Bailey (Short Trips: Seven Deadly Sins)
"A Life in the Day" by Xanna Eve Chown (Short Trips: A Day in the Life)
"Far Away in a Manger" by Iain McLaughlin (Short Trips: The Ghosts of Christmas)
"The Stars Our Contamination" by Steven Savile (Short Trips: The Ghosts of Christmas)
"Methuselah" by George Mann (Short Trips: Transmissions)
"See No Evil" by Steve Lyons (Short Trips: Transmissions)
"Return on Investment" by Rachel Steffan (Shelf Life)
"Of Eden Stood Disconsolate" by Rachel Simpson Hutchens (Shelf Life)
 "Something Borrowed" by Richelle Mead (Doctor Who 12 Doctors 12 Stories)

Comics
"Kane's Story" / "Abel's Story" / "The Warrior's Story" / "Frobisher's Story" by Max Stockbridge and John Ridgway (Doctor Who Magazine 104–107
"Exodus" / "Revelation" / "Genesis" by Alan McKenzie and John Ridgway (Doctor Who Magazine 108–110)
"Nature of the Beast" by Simon Furman and John Ridgway (Doctor Who Magazine 111–113)
"Time Bomb" by Jamie Delano and John Ridgway (Doctor Who Magazine 114–116)
"Salad Daze" by Simon Furman and John Ridgway (Doctor Who Magazine 117)
"Changes" by Grant Morrison and John Ridgway (Doctor Who Magazine" 118–119)
"Profits of Doom" by Mike Collins, John Ridgway and Tim Perkins (Doctor Who Magazine 120–122)
"The Gift" by Jamie Delano, John Ridgway and Tim Perkins (Doctor Who Magazine 123–126)
"The World Shapers" by Grant Morrison, John Ridgway and Tim Perkins (Doctor Who Magazine 127–129)
"Emperor of the Daleks" by Paul Cornell, John Freeman and John Ridgway (Doctor Who Magazine 197; cameo)
"The Curse of the Scarab" by Alan Barnes and Martin Geraghty (Doctor Who Magazine 228–230)
"Ground Zero" by Scott Gray, Martin Geraghty and Bambos Georgiou (Doctor Who Magazine 238–242)

Legacy
Peri Lomax, a fictional character from the British Channel 4 soap opera Hollyoaks'', played by Ruby O'Donnell, was named after Peri.

References

External links

 Peri Brown on the BBC's Doctor Who website''

Television characters introduced in 1984
Doctor Who companions
Doctor Who audio characters
American female characters in television
Fictional characters from Pasadena, California
Fictional botanists